The 1988 Nippon Professional Baseball season was the 39th season of operation for the league.

Regular season standings

Central League

Pacific League

Japan Series

See also
1988 Major League Baseball season

References

 
1988 in baseball
1988 in Japanese sport